Thenkarai is a panchayat grama in Theni district in the Indian state of Tamil Nadu.

Demographics
 India census, Thenkarai had a population of 11,616. Males constitute 51% of the population and females 49%. Thenkarai has an average literacy rate of 56%, lower than the national average of 59.5%: male literacy is 66%, and female literacy is 46%. In Thenkarai, 11% of the population is under 6 years of age.

References

Cities and towns in Theni district